The 1972 Australian Grand Prix was a motor race for cars complying with the Tasman Formula, which admitted both Formula 5000 and 2-litre racing cars. It was held at Sandown International Raceway, Victoria, Australia on 20 February 1972.

The race was the thirty seventh Australian Grand Prix and it was held only 3 months after the 1971 race. It was also round seven of the 1972 Tasman Series. The race had 19 starters.

Defending winner Frank Matich started the race on pole in his Repco Holden powered Matich A50 which had won the 1971 race on debut. New Zealand's Graham McRae started alongside Matich on the front row in his Leda GM1-Chevrolet.

Matich led from the start but was out after just 5 laps with a failed scavenge pump. McRae recorded the first of three AGP wins (all won at Sandown) by 3 seconds from the Lola T300-Chevrolet of Frank Gardner who had qualified 3rd. British International 
driver David Hobbs finished 3rd in his McLaren M18/M22-Chevrolet after starting from 4th on the grid.

McRae's win gave him an unassailable points lead in the 1972 Tasman Series with one round remaining.

Classification 

Results as follows:

Qualifying

Race

Notes
 Pole position: Frank Matich – 1:01.3
 Fastest lap: Graham McRae – 1:02.4

References

Grand Prix
Australian Grand Prix
Motorsport at Sandown
Formula 5000 race reports
Tasman Series
Australian Grand Prix